Michał Bieniek (born 17 May 1984, in Gryfino) is a former Polish athlete who specialized in the high jump. He competed at the 2008 Summer Olympics. His personal best is 2.36 meters achieved in 2005 in Biała Podlaska.

Competition record

References

External links

1984 births
Living people
Polish male high jumpers
Athletes (track and field) at the 2008 Summer Olympics
Olympic athletes of Poland
People from Gryfino County
Sportspeople from West Pomeranian Voivodeship